Lynn Franklin (December 19, 1922 in Mississippi – 2005) was an American author, and the most highly decorated officer in Beverly Hills Police history. He is most famous for being the Beverly Hills Police detective who pulled over a car containing Robert F. Kennedy, Peter Lawford, and Ralph Greenson (Lawford was behind the wheel), the night he claims Marilyn Monroe was killed.  He received the Clinton H. Anderson Award.

Bibliography
Sawed-off Justice, 1976
The Beverly Hills Murder File, 1999

References

External links
 

People from Beverly Hills, California
People from Mississippi
1922 births
2005 deaths